Maus, often published with the subtitle A Survivor's Tale, is a graphic novel by American cartoonist Art Spiegelman, serialized from 1980 to 1991. It depicts Spiegelman interviewing his father about his experiences as a Polish Jew and Holocaust survivor. The work employs postmodern techniques, and represents Jews as mice and other Germans and Poles as cats and pigs. Critics have classified Maus as memoir, biography, history, fiction, autobiography, or a mix of genres. In 1992 it became the first graphic novel to win a Pulitzer Prize.

In the frame-tale timeline in the narrative present that begins in 1978 in New York City, Spiegelman talks with his father Vladek about his Holocaust experiences, gathering material and information for the Maus project he is preparing. In the narrative past, Spiegelman depicts these experiences, from the years leading up to World War II to his parents' liberation from the Nazi concentration camps. Much of the story revolves around Spiegelman's troubled relationship with his father and the absence of his mother, who died by suicide when he was 20. Her grief-stricken husband destroyed her written accounts of Auschwitz. The book uses a minimalist drawing style and displays innovation in its pacing, structure, and page layouts.

A three-page strip also called "Maus" that he made in 1972 gave Spiegelman an opportunity to interview his father about his life during World War II. The recorded interviews became the basis for the book, which Spiegelman began in 1978. He serialized Maus from 1980 until 1991 as an insert in Raw, an avant-garde comics and graphics magazine published by Spiegelman and his wife, Françoise Mouly, who also appears in Maus. A collected volume of the first six chapters that appeared in 1986, Maus I: My Father Bleeds History, brought the book mainstream attention; a second volume, Maus II: And Here My Troubles Began, collected the remaining chapters in 1991. Maus was one of the first books in graphic novel format to receive significant academic attention in the English-speaking world.

Synopsis
Most of the book weaves in and out of two timelines. In the frame tale of the narrative present, Spiegelman interviews his father Vladek in the Rego Park neighborhood of Queens in New York City in 1978–79. The story that Vladek tells unfolds in the narrative past, which begins in the mid-1930s, and continues until the end of the Holocaust in 1945.

In Rego Park in 1958, a young Art Spiegelman is skating with his friends when he falls down and hurts himself, but his friends keep going. When he returns home, he finds his father Vladek, who asks him why he is upset, and Art proceeds to tell him that his friends left him behind. His father responds in broken English, "Friends? Your friends? If you lock them together in a room with no food for a week, then you could see what it is, friends!"

As an adult, Art visits his father, from whom he has become estranged.  Vladek has remarried to a woman called Mala since the suicide of Art's mother Anja in 1968. Art asks Vladek to recount his Holocaust experiences. Vladek tells of his time in the Polish city of Częstochowa and how he came to marry into Anja's wealthy family in 1937 and move to Sosnowiec to become a manufacturer. Vladek begs Art not to include this in the book and Art reluctantly agrees. Anja suffers a breakdown due to postpartum depression after giving birth to their first son Richieu, and the couple go to a sanitarium in Nazi-occupied Czechoslovakia for her to recover. After they return, political and anti-Semitic tensions build until Vladek is drafted just before the Nazi invasion of Poland. Vladek is captured at the front and forced to work as a prisoner of war. After his release, he finds Germany has annexed Sosnowiec, and he is dropped off on the other side of the border in the German protectorate. He sneaks across the border and reunites with his family.

During one of Art's visits, he finds that a friend of Mala's has sent the couple one of the underground comix magazines Art contributed to. Mala had tried to hide it, but Vladek finds and reads it. In "Prisoner on the Hell Planet", Art is traumatized by his mother's suicide three months after his release from the mental hospital, and in the end depicts himself behind bars saying, "You murdered me, Mommy, and left me here to take the rap!"  Though it brings back painful memories, Vladek admits that dealing with the issue in such a way was for the best.

In 1943, the Nazis move the Jews of the Sosnowiec Ghetto to Srodula and march them back to Sosnowiec to work. The family splits up—Vladek and Anja send Richieu to Zawiercie to stay with an aunt for safety. As more Jews are sent from the ghettos to Auschwitz, the aunt poisons herself, her children and Richieu to death to escape the Gestapo and not die in the gas chamber. In Srodula, many Jews build bunkers to hide from the Germans. Vladek's bunker is discovered and he is placed into a "ghetto inside the ghetto" surrounded by barbed wire. The remnants of Vladek and Anja's family are taken away. Srodula is cleared of its Jews, except for a group Vladek hides with in another bunker. When the Germans depart, the group splits up and leaves the ghetto.

In Sosnowiec, Vladek and Anja move from one hiding place to the next, making occasional contact with other Jews in hiding. Vladek disguises himself as an ethnic Pole and hunts for provisions. The couple arrange with smugglers to escape to Hungary, but it is a trick—the Gestapo arrest them on the train (as Hungary is invaded) and take them to Auschwitz, where they are separated until after the war.

Art asks after Anja's diaries, which Vladek tells him were her account of her Holocaust experiences and the only record of what happened to her after her separation from Vladek at Auschwitz and which Vladek says she had wanted Art to read. Vladek comes to admit that he burned them after she killed herself. Art is enraged and calls Vladek a "murderer".

The story jumps to 1986, after the first six chapters of Maus have appeared in a collected edition. Art is overcome with the unexpected attention the book receives and finds himself "totally blocked". Art talks about the book with his psychiatrist Paul Pavel, a Czech Holocaust survivor. Pavel suggests that, as those who perished in the camps can never tell their stories, "maybe it's better not to have any more stories". Art replies with a quote from Samuel Beckett: "Every word is like an unnecessary stain on silence and nothingness", but then realizes, "on the other hand, he said it".

Vladek tells of his hardship in the camps, of starvation and abuse, of his resourcefulness, of avoiding the —the process by which prisoners were selected for further labor or execution. Despite the danger, Anja and Vladek exchange occasional messages. As the war progresses and the German front is pushed back, the prisoners are marched from Auschwitz in occupied Poland to Gross-Rosen within the Reich and then to Dachau, where the hardships only increase and Vladek catches typhus.

The war ends, the camp survivors are freed and Vladek and Anja reunite. The book closes with Vladek turning over in his bed as he finishes his story and telling Art, "I'm tired from talking, Richieu, and it's enough stories for now". The final image is of Vladek and Anja's tombstone—Vladek died in 1982, before the book was completed.

Primary characters

Background
Art Spiegelman was born on February 15, 1948, in Sweden to Polish Jews and Holocaust survivors Vladek and Anja Spiegelman. An aunt poisoned his parents' first son Richieu to avoid capture by the Nazis, four years before Spiegelman's birth. He and his parents emigrated to the United States in 1951. During his youth his mother occasionally talked about Auschwitz, but his father did not want him to know about it.

Spiegelman developed an interest in comics early and began drawing professionally at 16. He spent a month in Binghamton State Mental Hospital in 1968 after a nervous breakdown. Shortly after he got out, his mother died by suicide.  Spiegelman's father was not happy with his son's involvement in the hippie subculture. Spiegelman said that when he bought himself a German Volkswagen it damaged their already-strained relationship "beyond repair". Around this time, Spiegelman read in fanzines about such graphic artists as Frans Masereel who had made wordless novels. The discussions in those fanzines about making the Great American Novel in comics inspired him.

Spiegelman became a key figure in the underground comix movement of the 1970s, both as cartoonist and editor. In 1972 Justin Green produced the semi-autobiographical comic book Binky Brown Meets the Holy Virgin Mary, which inspired other underground cartoonists to produce more personal and revealing work. The same year, Green asked Spiegelman to contribute a three-page strip for the first issue of Funny  , which Green edited. Spiegelman wanted to do a strip about racism, and at first considered focusing on African Americans, with cats as Ku Klux Klan members chasing African-American mice. Instead, he turned to the Holocaust and depicted Nazi cats persecuting Jewish mice in a strip he titled "Maus". The tale was narrated to a mouse named "Mickey". After finishing the strip, Spiegelman visited his father to show him the finished work, which he had based in part on an anecdote he had heard about his father's Auschwitz experience. His father gave him further background information, which piqued Spiegelman's interest. Spiegelman recorded a series of interviews over four days with his father, which was to provide the basis of the longer Maus. Spiegelman followed up with extensive research, reading survivors' accounts and talking to friends and family who had also survived. He got detailed information about Sosnowiec from a series of Polish pamphlets published after the war which detailed what happened to the Jews by region.

In 1973, Spiegelman produced a strip for Short Order Comix #1 about his mother's suicide called "Prisoner on the Hell Planet". The same year, he edited a pornographic, psychedelic book of quotations, and dedicated it to his mother. He spent the rest of the 1970s building his reputation making short avant-garde comics. He moved back to New York from San Francisco in 1975, which he admitted to his father only in 1977, by which time he had decided to work on a "very long comic book". He began another series of interviews with his father in 1978, and visited Auschwitz in 1979. He serialized the story in a comics and graphics magazine he and his wife Mouly began in 1980 called Raw.

Comics medium
American comic books were big business with a diversity of genres in the 1940s and 1950s, but had reached a low ebb by the late 1970s.  By the time Maus began serialization, the "Big Two" comics publishers, Marvel and DC Comics, dominated the industry with mostly superhero titles. The underground comix movement that had flourished in the late 1960s and early 1970s also seemed moribund. The public perception of comic books was as adolescent power fantasies, inherently incapable of mature artistic or literary expression. Most discussion focused on comics as a genre rather than as a medium.

Maus came to prominence when the term "graphic novel" was beginning to gain currency.  Will Eisner popularized the term with the publication in 1978 of A Contract with God. The term was used partly to rise above the low cultural status that comics had in the English-speaking world, and partly because the term "comic book" was being used to refer to short-form periodicals, leaving no accepted vocabulary with which to talk about book-form comics.

Publication history
The first chapter of Maus appeared in December 1980 in the second issue of Raw as a small insert; a new chapter appeared in each issue until the magazine came to an end in 1991. Every chapter but the last appeared in Raw.

Spiegelman struggled to find a publisher for a book edition of Maus, but after a rave New York Times review of the serial in August 1986, Pantheon Books published the first six chapters in a volume called Maus: A Survivor's Tale and subtitled My Father Bleeds History. Spiegelman was relieved that the book's publication preceded the theatrical release of the animated film An American Tail by three months, as he believed that the film, produced by Steven Spielberg's Amblin Entertainment, was inspired by Maus and wished to avoid comparisons with it.

The book found a large audience, partly because of its distribution through bookstores rather than the direct market comic shops where comic books were normally sold. Maus was difficult for critics and reviewers to classify, and also for booksellers, who needed to know on which shelves to place it. Though Pantheon pushed for the term "graphic novel", Spiegelman was not comfortable with this, as many book-length comics were being referred to as "graphic novels" whether or not they had novelistic qualities. He suspected the term's use was an attempt to validate the comics form, rather than to describe the content of the books. Spiegelman later came to accept the term, and with Drawn & Quarterly publisher Chris Oliveros successfully lobbied the Book Industry Study Group in the early 2000s to include "graphic novel" as a category in bookstores.

Pantheon collected the last five chapters in 1991 in a second volume subtitled And Here My Troubles Began. Pantheon later collected the two volumes into soft- and hardcover two-volume boxed sets and single-volume editions. In 1994 the Voyager Company released The Complete Maus on CD-ROM, a collection which contained the original comics, Vladek's taped transcripts, filmed interviews, sketches, and other background material. The CD-ROM was based on HyperCard, a Macintosh and Apple IIGS application that has since become obsolete. In 2011 Pantheon Books published a companion to The Complete Maus entitled MetaMaus, with further background material, including filmed footage of Vladek. The centerpiece of the book is a Spiegelman interview conducted by Hillary Chute. It also has interviews with Spiegelman's wife and children, sketches, photographs, family trees, assorted artwork, and a DVD with video, audio, photos, and an interactive version of Maus.

Spiegelman dedicated Maus to his brother Richieu and his first daughter Nadja. The book's epigraph is a quote from Adolf Hitler: "The Jews are undoubtedly a race, but they are not human".

International publication
Penguin Books obtained the rights to publish the initial volume in the Commonwealth in 1986. In support of the African National Congress's cultural boycott in opposition to apartheid, Spiegelman refused to "compromise with fascism" by allowing publication of his work in South Africa.

By 2011, Maus had been translated into about 30 languages. Three translations were particularly important to Spiegelman: French, as his wife was French, and because of his respect for the sophisticated Franco-Belgian comics tradition; German, given the book's background; and Polish. Poland was the setting for most of the book, and Polish was the language of his parents and his own mother tongue. The publishers of the German edition had to convince the German culture ministry of the work's serious intent to have the swastika appear on the cover, per laws prohibiting the display of Nazi symbolism. Reception in Germany was positive—Maus was a best-seller and was taught in schools. The Polish translation encountered difficulties; as early as 1987, when Spiegelman planned a research visit to Poland, the Polish consulate official who approved his visa questioned him about the Poles' depiction as pigs, and pointed out how serious an insult it was. Publishers and commentators refused to deal with the book for fear of protests and boycotts. Demonstrators protested Mauss publication and burned the book in front of Gazetas offices. Bikont's response was to don a pig mask and wave to the protesters from the office windows. The magazine-sized Japanese translation was the only authorized edition with larger pages. Long-standing plans for an Arabic translation have yet to come to fruition. A Russian law passed in December 2014 prohibiting the display of Nazi propaganda led to the removal of Maus from Russian bookstores leading up to Victory Day due to the swastika appearing on the book's cover.

A few panels were changed for the Hebrew edition of Maus. Based on Vladek's memory, Spiegelman portrayed one of the minor characters as a member of the Nazi-installed Jewish Police. An Israeli descendant objected and threatened to sue for libel. Spiegelman redrew the character with a fedora in place of his original police hat, but appended a note to the volume voicing his objection to this "intrusion". This version of the first volume appeared in 1990 from the publishing house Zmora Bitan. It had an indifferent or negative reception, and the publisher did not release the second volume. Another Israeli publisher put out both volumes, with a new translation by poet Yehuda Vizan that included Vladek's broken language, which Zmora Bitan had refused to do. Marilyn Reizbaum saw this as highlighting a difference between the self-image of the Israeli Jew as a fearless defender of the homeland, and that of the American Jew as a feeble victim, something that one Israeli writer disparaged as "the diaspora sickness".

Themes

Presentation

Spiegelman, like many of his critics, has expressed concern that "[r]eality is too much for comics ... so much has to be left out or distorted", admitting that his presentation of the story may not be accurate. He takes a postmodern approach; Maus "feeds on itself", telling the story of how the story was made. It examines the choices Spiegelman made in the retelling of his father's memories, and the artistic choices he had to make. For example, when his French wife converts to Judaism, Spiegelman's character frets over whether to depict her as a frog, a mouse, or another animal.

The book portrays humans with the heads and tails of different species of animals; Jews are drawn as mice and other Germans and Poles as cats and pigs, among others. Spiegelman took advantage of the way Nazi propaganda films depicted Jews as vermin, though he was first struck by the metaphor after attending a presentation where Ken Jacobs showed films of minstrel shows along with early American animated films, abundant with racial caricatures.  Spiegelman derived the mouse as symbol for the Jew from Nazi propaganda, emphasized in a quote from a German newspaper in the 1930s that prefaces the second volume: "Mickey Mouse is the most miserable idea ever revealed ... Healthy emotions tell every independent young man and every honorable youth that the dirty and filth-covered vermin, the greatest bacteria carrier in the animal kingdom, cannot be the ideal type of animal ... Away with Jewish brutalization of the people! Down with Mickey Mouse! Wear the Swastika Cross!"

Jewish characters try to pass themselves off as ethnic Poles by tying pig masks to their faces, with the strings showing at the back.  Vladek's disguise was more convincing than Anja's—"you could see she was more Jewish", Vladek says. Spiegelman shows this Jewishness by having her tail hang out of her disguise. This literalization of the genocidal stereotypes that drove the Nazis to their Final Solution may risk reinforcing racist labels, but Spiegelman uses the idea to create anonymity for the characters. According to art historian Andrea Liss, this may paradoxically enable the reader to identify with the characters as human, preventing the reader from observing racial characteristics based on facial traits, while reminding readers that racist classification is ever present.

In making people of each ethnicity look alike, Spiegelman hoped to show the absurdity of dividing people along such lines. Spiegelman has stated that "these metaphors ... are meant to self-destruct" and "reveal the inanity of the notion itself". Animals signified the characters' roles in the story rather than their races—the gentile Françoise is a mouse because of her identification with her husband, who identifies with the Holocaust victims. When asked what animal he would make Israeli Jews, Spiegelman suggests porcupines. When Art visits his psychiatrist, the two wear mouse masks.  Spiegelman's perceptions of the animal metaphor seem to have evolved over the book's making—in the original publication of the first volume, his self-portrait showed a mouse head on a human body, but by the time the second volume arrived, his self-portrait had become that of a man wearing a mouse mask. In Maus, the characters seem to be mice and cats only in their predator/prey relationship. In every respect other than their heads and tails, they act and speak as ordinary humans. Further complicating the animal metaphor, Anja is ironically shown to be afraid of mice, while other characters appear with pet dogs and cats, and the Nazis with attack dogs.

Memory
To Marianne Hirsch, Spiegelman's life is "dominated by memories that are not his own".  His work is one not of memory but of postmemory, a term she coined after encountering Maus. This describes the relation of the children of survivors with the survivors themselves. While these children have not had their parents' experiences, they grow up with their parents' memories—the memory of another's memory—until the stories become so powerful that for these children they become memories in their own right. The children's proximity creates a "deep personal connection" with the memory, though separated from it by "generational distance". In the field of psychology, this is called transgenerational trauma or generational trauma.

Art tried to keep his father's story chronological, because otherwise he would "never keep it straight". His mother Anja's memories are conspicuously absent from the narrative, given her suicide and Vladek's destruction of her diaries. Hirsch sees Maus in part as an attempt to reconstruct her memory. Vladek keeps her memory alive with the pictures on his desk, "like a shrine", according to Mala.

Guilt
Spiegelman displays his sense of guilt in many ways. He suffers anguish over his dead brother, Richieu, who perished in the Holocaust, and whom he feels he can never live up to. The eighth chapter, made after the publication and unexpected success of the first volume, opens with a guilt-ridden Spiegelman (now in human form, with a strapped-on mouse mask) atop a pile of corpses—the corpses of the six million Jews upon whom Maus success was built. He is told by his psychiatrist that his father feels guilt for having survived and for outliving his first son, and that some of Art's guilt may spring from painting his father in such an unflattering way. As he had not lived in the camps himself, he finds it difficult to understand or visualize this "separate universe", and feels inadequate in portraying it.

Racism
Spiegelman parodies the Nazis' vision of racial divisions; Vladek's racism is also put on display when he becomes upset that Françoise would pick up a black hitchhiker, a "schwartser" as he says. When she berates him, a victim of antisemitism, for his attitude, he replies, "It's not even to compare, the schwartsers and the Jews!" Spiegelman gradually deconstructs the animal metaphor throughout the book, especially in the second volume, showing where the lines cannot be drawn between races of humans.

The Germans are depicted with little difference between them, but there is great variety among the Poles and Jews who dominate the story. Sometimes Jews and the Jewish councils are shown complying with the occupiers; some trick other Jews into capture, while others act as police for the Nazis.

Spiegelman shows numerous instances of Poles who risked themselves to aid Jews, and also shows antisemitism as being rife among them. The kapos who run the camps are Poles, and Anja and Vladek are tricked by Polish smugglers into the hands of the Nazis. Anja and Vladek hear stories that Poles continue to drive off and even kill returning Jews after the war.

Language
Vladek's English is broken in contrast with that of Art's more fluent therapist, Paul Pavel, who is also an immigrant and Holocaust survivor. Vladek's knowledge of the language helps him several times during the story, as when he uses it to meet Anja. He also uses it to befriend a Frenchman, and continues to correspond with him in English after the war. His recounting of the Holocaust, first to American soldiers, then to his son, is never in his mother tongue, and English becomes his daily language when he moves to America. His difficulty with his second language is revealed as Art writes his dialogue in broken English; when Vladek is imprisoned he tells Art, "[E]very day we prayed ... I was very religious, and it wasn't else to do".  Late in the book, Vladek talks of Dachau, saying, "And here ... my troubles began", though clearly his troubles had begun long before Dachau. This unidiomatic expression was used as the subtitle of the second volume.

The German word Maus is cognate to the English word "mouse", and also reminiscent of the German verb mauscheln, which means "to speak like a Jew" and refers to the way Jews from Eastern Europe spoke German—a word etymologically related not to Maus but, distantly, to Moses.

Style

Spiegelman's perceived audacity in using the Holocaust as his subject was compounded by his telling the story in comics. The prevailing view in the English-speaking world held comics as inherently trivial, thus degrading Spiegelman's subject matter, especially as he used animal heads in place of recognizably human ones. Talking animals have been a staple of comics, and while they have a traditional reputation as children's fare, the underground had long made use of them in adult stories, for example in Robert Crumb's Fritz the Cat, which comics critic Joseph Witek asserts shows that the genre could "open up the way to a paradoxical narrative realism" that Maus exploited.

Ostensibly about the Holocaust, the story entwines with the frame tale of Art interviewing and interacting with his father. Art's "Prisoner on the Hell Planet" is also encompassed by the frame, and stands in visual and thematic contrast with the rest of the book as the characters are in human form in a surreal, German Expressionist woodcut style inspired by Lynd Ward.

Spiegelman blurs the line between the frame and the world, such as when neurotically trying to deal with what Maus is becoming for him, he says to his wife: "In real life you'd never have let me talk this long without interrupting". When a prisoner whom the Nazis believe to be a Jew claims to be German, Spiegelman has difficulty deciding whether to present this character as a cat or a mouse. Throughout the book, Spiegelman incorporates and highlights banal details from his father's tales, sometimes humorous or ironic, giving a lightness and humanity to the story which "helps carry the weight of the unbearable historical realities".

Spiegelman started taking down his interviews with Vladek on paper, but quickly switched to a tape recorder, face-to-face or over the phone.  Spiegelman often condensed Vladek's words, and occasionally added to the dialogue or synthesized multiple retellings into a single portrayal.

Spiegelman worried about the effect that his organizing of Vladek's story would have on its authenticity. In the end, he eschewed a Joycean approach and settled on a linear narrative he thought would be better at "getting things across". He strove to present how the book was recorded and organized as an integral part of the book itself, expressing the "sense of an interview shaped by a relationship".

Artwork
The story is text-driven, with few wordless panels among its 1,500 black-and-white panels. The art has high contrast, with heavy black areas and thick black borders balanced against areas of white and wide white margins. There is little gray in the shading. In the narrative present, the pages are arranged in eight-panel grids; in the narrative past, Spiegelman found himself "violating the grid constantly" with his page layouts.

Spiegelman rendered the original three-page "Maus" and "Prisoner on the Hell Planet" in highly detailed, expressive styles. Spiegelman planned to draw Maus in such a manner, but after initial sketches he decided to use a pared-down style, one little removed from his pencil sketches, which he found more direct and immediate. Characters are rendered in a minimalist way: animal heads with dots for eyes and slashes for eyebrows and mouths, sitting on humanoid bodies. Spiegelman wanted to get away from the rendering of the characters in the original "Maus", in which oversized cats towered over the Jewish mice, an approach which Spiegelman says, "tells you how to feel, tells you how to think". He preferred to let the reader make independent moral judgments. He drew the cat-Nazis the same size as the mouse-Jews, and dropped the stereotypical villainous expressions.

Spiegelman wanted the artwork to have a diary feel to it, and so drew the pages on stationery with a fountain pen and typewriter correction fluid. It was reproduced at the same size it was drawn, unlike his other work, which was usually drawn larger and shrunk down, which hides defects in the art.

Influences

Spiegelman has published articles promoting a greater knowledge of his medium's history. Chief among his early influences were Harvey Kurtzman, Will Eisner, and Bernard Krigstein's "Master Race". Though he acknowledged Eisner's early work as an influence, he denied that Eisner's first graphic novel, A Contract with God (1978), had any impact on Maus. He cited Harold Gray's comic strip Little Orphan Annie as having "influenced Maus fairly directly", and praised Gray's work for using a cartoon-based storytelling vocabulary, rather than an illustration-based one. Justin Green's Binky Brown Meets the Holy Virgin Mary (1972) inspired Spiegelman to include autobiographical elements in his comics. Spiegelman stated, "without Binky Brown, there would be no Maus". Among the graphic artists who influenced Maus, Spiegelman cited Frans Masereel, who had made early wordless novels in woodcuts such as Passionate Journey (1919).

Reception and legacy
Spiegelman's work as cartoonist and editor had long been known and respected in the comics community, but the media attention after the first volume's publication in 1986 was unexpected. Hundreds of overwhelmingly positive reviews appeared, and Maus became the center of new attention focused on comics. It was considered one of the "Big Three" book-form comics from around 1986–87, along with Watchmen and The Dark Knight Returns, that are said to have brought the term "graphic novel" and the idea of comics for adults into mainstream consciousness. It was credited with changing the public's perception of what comics could be at a time when, in the English-speaking world, they were considered to be for children, and strongly associated with superheroes. Initially, critics of Maus showed a reluctance to include comics in literary discourse. The New York Times intended praise when saying of the book, "Art Spiegelman doesn't draw comic books". After its Pulitzer Prize win, it won greater acceptance and interest among academics. The Museum of Modern Art staged an exhibition on the making of Maus in 1991–92.

Maus proved difficult to classify to a genre, and has been called biography, fiction, autobiography, history, and memoir.  Spiegelman petitioned The New York Times to move it from "fiction" to "non-fiction" on the newspaper's bestseller list, saying, "I shudder to think how David Duke ... would respond to seeing a carefully researched work based closely on my father's memories of life in Hitler's Europe and in the death camps classified as fiction". An editor responded, "Let's go out to Spiegelman's house and if a giant mouse answers the door, we'll move it to the nonfiction side of the list!" The Times eventually acquiesced. The Pulitzer committee sidestepped the issue by giving the completed Maus a Special Award in Letters in 1992.

Maus ranked highly on comics and literature lists. The Comics Journal called it the fourth greatest comics work of the 20th century, and Wizard placed it first on their list of 100 Greatest Graphic Novels. Entertainment Weekly listed Maus at seventh place on their list of "The New Classics: Books – The 100 Best Reads from 1983 to 2008", and Time put Maus at seventh place on their list of best non-fiction books from between 1923 and 2005, and fourth on their list of top graphic novels. Praise for the book also came from contemporaries such as Jules Feiffer and literary writers such as Umberto Eco.  Spiegelman turned down numerous offers to have Maus adapted for film or television.

Early installments of Maus that appeared in Raw inspired the young Chris Ware to "try to do comics that had a 'serious' tone to them". Maus is cited as a primary influence on graphic novels such as Marjane Satrapi's Persepolis and Alison Bechdel's Fun Home.

In 1999, cartoonist Ted Rall had an article published in The Village Voice criticizing Spiegelman's prominence and influence in the New York cartooning community. Entitled "King Maus: Art Spiegelman Rules the World of Comix With Favors and Fear", it accused the Pulitzer board of opportunism in selecting Maus, which Rall deemed unworthy. Cartoonist Danny Hellman responded to the piece with a series of emails in which Hellman impersonated Rall to his editors and colleagues. Hellman followed up by posting fake responses from New York magazine editors and art directors. Rall launched a lawsuit seeking damages of $1.5 million for libel, breach of privacy, and causing emotional distress. To raise funds, in 2001 Hellman had the Legal Action Comics anthology published, which included a back cover by Spiegelman in which he endorsed Hellman's actions, depicting Rall as a urinal.

In 2022, the board of trustees for McMinn County Schools in east Tennessee voted unanimously to remove Maus from the curriculum over concerns including profanity, violence, and nudity. The decision led to a backlash and attracted attention the day before Holocaust Remembrance Day, and was covered by media in the United States, Europe, Asia, and Africa. Spiegelman called the decision baffling, "Orwellian", and "daffily myopic". The ban led to Amazon sales of Maus rising to No. 1. On January 30, 2022, it was the No. 1 overall for books. On January 31, Maus held the No. 1 and No. 2 ranks on Amazon at different times during the day, and also appeared as a best seller on Barnes & Noble's top 100 list and Bookshop's index of best-selling books.

Critique
A cottage industry of academic research has built up around Maus, and schools have frequently used it as course material in a range of fields, including history, dysfunctional family psychology, language arts, and social studies. The volume of academic work published on Maus far surpasses that of any other work of comics. One of the earliest such works was Joshua Brown's 1988 "Of Mice and Memory" from the Oral History Review, which deals with the problems Spiegelman faced in presenting his father's story. Marianne Hirsch wrote an influential essay on post-memory entitled "Family Pictures: Maus, Mourning, and Post-Memory", later expanded into a book called Family Frames: Photography, Narrative, and Postmemory. Academics far outside the field of comics such as Dominick LaCapra, Linda Hutcheon, and Terrence Des Pres took part in the discourse. Few approached Maus who were familiar with comics, largely because of the lack of an academic comics tradition—Maus tended to be approached as Holocaust history or from a film or literary perspective. In 2003, Deborah Geis edited a collection of essays on Maus called Considering Maus: Approaches to Art Spiegelman's "Survivor's Tale" of the Holocaust.  Maus is considered an important work of Holocaust literature, and studies of it have made significant contributions to Holocaust studies.

According to writer Arie Kaplan, some Holocaust survivors objected to Spiegelman making a comic book out of their tragedy. Literary critics such as Hillel Halkin objected that the animal metaphor was "doubly dehumanizing", reinforcing the Nazi belief that the atrocities were perpetrated by one species on another, when they were actually done by humans against humans. Comics writer and critic Harvey Pekar and others saw Spiegelman's use of animals as potentially reinforcing stereotypes. Pekar was also disdainful of Spiegelman's overwhelmingly negative portrayal of his father, calling him disingenuous and hypocritical for such a portrayal in a book that presents itself as objective. Comics critic R. C. Harvey argued that Spiegelman's animal metaphor threatened "to erode  moral underpinnings", and played "directly into  racist vision".

Commentators such as Peter Obst and Lawrence Weschler expressed concern over the Poles' depiction as pigs, which reviewer Marek Kohn saw as an ethnic slur and The Norton Anthology of American Literature called "a calculated insult". Jewish culture views pigs and pork as non-kosher, or unclean, a point of which the Jewish Spiegelman was unlikely to be ignorant. Critics such as Obst and Pekar have said that the portrayal of Poles is unbalanced—that, while some Poles are seen as helping Jews, they are often shown doing so for self-serving reasons.  In the late 1990s, an objector to Mauss depiction of Poles interrupted a presentation by Spiegelman at Montreal's McGill University with persistent abuse and was removed from the auditorium.

Literary critic Walter Ben Michaels found Spiegelman's racial divisions "counterfactual".  Spiegelman depicts Europeans as different animal species based on Nazi conceptions of race, but all Americans, both black and white, as dogs—with the exception of the Jews, who remain unassimilated mice. To Michaels, Maus seems to gloss over the racial inequality that has plagued the history of the U.S.

Scholar Bart Beaty disagrees with claims from other critics that Maus presents a fatalistic perspective. Rather, he argues that Maus problematizes the essentialistic understanding of the relationship between the German "cats" and Jewish "mice," or the notion that there is something natural about Germans killing Jewish people.

Scholar Paul Buhle asserted: "More than a few readers have described  as the most compelling of any  depiction, perhaps because only the caricatured quality of comic art is equal to the seeming unreality of an experience beyond all reason". Michael Rothberg opined: "By situating a nonfictional story in a highly mediated, unreal, 'comic' space, Spiegelman captures the hyperintensity of Auschwitz".

Parody 
Belgian publisher La Cinquième Couch anonymously produced a book entitled Katz, a remix of Spiegelman's book but with all animal heads replaced with cat heads.  The book reproduced every page and line of dialogue from the French translation of Maus.  The French publisher of the book, Flammarion, had the Belgian publisher destroy all copies under charges of copyright violation.

Awards and nominations

See also

 Anthropomorphism
 Birds' Head Haggadah
 Ethnic stereotypes in comics
 Mickey au Camp de Gurs
 Stereotypes of Jews in literature

Notes

References

Works cited

Books

 
 
 
  (attributed to )
 
 
 
 
 
  (Originally in Independent on Sunday on 1992-03-22)
 
 
 
 
 
 
 
 
 
 
 
 
 
 
 
 
 
 
 
 
 
 
 
 
 
 
 
 
 
 
 
 
 
  (Originally in Oral History Journal Vol. 15, Spring 1987)

Journals and magazines

Newspapers

Websites

Further reading

External links

 (video) Art Spiegelman and the Making of Maus  (broken link)
 Teacher's guide at Random House
 Art Spiegelman's MAUS: Working Through the Trauma of the Holocaust. In Responses to the Holocaust, University of Virginia
 Spiegelman discusses Maus with Paul Gravett - a British Library sound recording

1980 comics debuts
1991 graphic novels
Fiction set in 1978
Fiction set in 1979
American graphic novels
Angoulême International Comics Festival Best Foreign Album award winners
Autobiographical graphic novels
Biographical graphic novels
Comics by Art Spiegelman
Comics set in New York City
Comics set in Poland
Comics about Nazi Germany
Comics set in the 1930s
Comics set in the 1940s
Comics set in the 1970s
Comics set in the 1980s
Comics about animals
Comics about mice and rats
Comics about dogs
Comics about pigs
Eisner Award winners
Eisner Award winners for Best Graphic Album: Reprint
Fictional mice and rats
Harvey Award winners for Best Graphic Album of Previously Published Work
Books about the Holocaust
Jewish Polish history
Jewish-related comics
Non-fiction graphic novels
Pantheon Books graphic novels
Pulitzer Prize-winning works
Raw (magazine)
Comics set during World War II
American Book Award-winning works
Race-related controversies in comics
Obscenity controversies in comics
McMinn County, Tennessee
Comics about the Holocaust